The Scotch Game, or Scotch Opening, is a chess opening that begins with the moves:
1. e4 e5
2. Nf3 Nc6
3. d4

Ercole del Rio, in his 1750 treatise Sopra il giuoco degli Scacchi, Osservazioni pratiche d’anonimo Autore Modenese ("On the game of Chess, practical Observations by an anonymous Modenese Author"), was the first author to mention what is now called the Scotch Game. The opening received its name from a correspondence match in 1824 between Edinburgh and London.  Popular in the 19th century, by 1900 the Scotch had lost favour among top players because it was thought to release the central tension too early and allow Black to  without difficulty. More recently, grandmasters Garry Kasparov and Jan Timman helped to repopularise the Scotch when they used it as a surprise weapon to avoid the well-analysed Ruy Lopez.

Analysis
Black usually plays 3...exd4, as they have no good way of maintaining their pawn on e5 (this same position can be reached by transposition from the Centre Game 1.e4 e5 2.d4 exd4 3.Nf3 Nc6). After 3...d6, White is better after 4.dxe5 dxe5 5.Qxd8+ Kxd8 6.Bc4, or they may simply play 4.Bb5, when 4...exd4 5.Nxd4 Bd7 transposes to the Steinitz Defense in the Ruy Lopez.

3...Nxd4 is possible, though rarely played today by strong players. It was popular in the 19th century, and receives five columns of analysis in Freeborough and Ranken's opening manual Chess Openings Ancient and Modern (3rd ed. 1896 p. 53). It is often described today as a strategic error, since after 4.Nxd4 exd4 5.Qxd4 (5.Bc4 is the Napoleon Gambit) White's queen stands on a central square, and is not developed too early since it cannot be chased away very effectively (5...c5? is a seriously weakening move that blocks Black's ). Nonetheless, the Encyclopaedia of Chess Openings (ECO) concludes that Black  with 5...Ne7 6.Bc4 Nc6 7.Qd5 Qf6 8.0-0 Ne5 9.Be2 c6 10.Qb3 Ng6 11.f4 Bc5+ 12.Kh1 d6 (I. Sokolov). Similarly, Harald Keilhack concludes in Knight on the Left: 1.Nc3 (p. 21) that although ...Nxd4 is a "non-line" these days, if Black continues perfectly it is not clear that White gets even a small advantage. Keilhack analyses 5.Qxd4 d6 6.Nc3 Nf6 7.Bc4 Be7 8.0-0 0-0 9.Bg5 c6 10.a4 Qa5 11.Bh4 and now after 11...Qe5 or 11...Be6, "White has at most this indescribable nothingness which is the advantage of the first move."  (Id. p. 25) The ECO also concludes that Black equalises after the alternative 4.Nxe5 Ne6 5.Bc4 Nf6 6.Nc3 Be7 7.0-0 0-0 8.Be3 d6 8.Nd3 Nxe4 10.Nxe4 d5 (Parma). The main line 3...exd4 4.Nxd4 may transpose into this position if Black chooses to play 4...Nxd4.

3...d6? is often regarded as a mistake and an automatic slight advantage for White. While 3...d6 does defend the e5 pawn, it allows White to play 4.d5 and kick out the knight. The resulting line of 4...Nce7 5.c4 Nf6 6.Nc3 Ng6 allows White an imposing center and better chances for winning. Opting to take on e5 still scores poorly for Black, as 4.dxe5 dxe5 5.Qxd8 leaves black in a losing dilemma: either take with the king and forgo castling rights (5...Kxd8) or to take with the c6 knight and lose the e5 pawn (5...Nxd8 6.Nxe5). Chess.com cites a meager 18% win rate for Black's 3...d6 move.

3...f5?! 4.Nxe5 transposes into a line of the dubious Latvian Gambit.
 
After the usual 3...exd4, White can respond with the main line 4.Nxd4 or can play a gambit by offering Black one or two pawns in exchange for rapid .

Main variations

After 1.e4 e5 2.Nf3 Nc6 3.d4 exd4, the most important continuations are:
 4.Nxd4 (Main line)
 4...Bc5 (Classical Variation)
 4...Nf6 (Schmidt Variation)
 4...Qh4 (Steinitz Variation)
 4...Qf6
 4...Nxd4
 4...Bb4+?!
 4.Bc4 (Scotch Gambit)
 4.c3 (Göring Gambit)
 4.Bb5 (Relfsson Gambit)

Main line: 4.Nxd4 

In the main line after 4.Nxd4, Black has two major options. Either 4...Bc5 or 4...Nf6 offers Black good chances for an equal game.

Classical Variation: 4...Bc5 

After 4...Bc5 White has 5.Nxc6, 5.Be3, or 5.Nb3. After 5.Nxc6, play almost always continues 5...Qf6 (Black does not lose a piece on c6 because he is threatening mate with 6...Qxf2) 6.Qd2 dxc6 7.Nc3. On 5.Be3 play almost always continues 5...Qf6 6.c3 Nge7 7.Bc4 (as proposed by IM Gary Lane in Winning with the Scotch; several seventh move alternatives for White are possible here, 7.g3 for example) 7...0-0 (7...Ne5 is more often played here. Play usually continues 8.Be2 Qg6 [8...d5 is also possible] 9.0-0. Here, Black has the option of taking the unprotected pawn on e4, but it is considered "poisoned".) 8.0-0 Bb6 where the position is roughly equal. On 5.Nb3 play almost always continues 5...Bb6 6.a4 a6 7.Nc3.  Another plan for White is to play 6.Nc3, followed by (in some order) Qe2, Be3, h4 and 0-0-0.

Schmidt Variation: 4...Nf6 
After 4...Nf6 White has 5.Nxc6 (the Mieses Variation) or 5.Nc3 (the Scotch Four Knights Game). After 5.Nc3 almost always played is 5...Bb4 6.Nxc6 bxc6 7.Bd3 d5 8.exd5 cxd5 9.0-0 0-0 10.Bg5 c6. After 5.Nxc6 bxc6 6.e5 Qe7 7.Qe2 Nd5 8.c4 is also very common. Where these main lines end, the first real opening decisions are made, which are too specific for this overview.

Steinitz Variation: 4...Qh4!? 
Steinitz's 4...Qh4!? almost wins a pawn by force, but White gets a lead in development and attacking chances as compensation. As of 2005, White's most successful line has been 5.Nc3 Bb4 6.Be2 Qxe4 7.Nb5 Bxc3+ 8.bxc3 Kd8 9.0-0, from which Black's awkwardly placed king has generally proven more significant than the extra pawn.

Scotch Gambit: 4.Bc4

Instead of 4.Nxd4, White has two ways to offer a gambit.  The Scotch Gambit (which is the line recommended by GM Lev Alburt in his book Chess Openings for White, Explained) starts with 4.Bc4.  Black can transpose into the Two Knights Defense with 4...Nf6, or he can continue the Scotch with 4...Bc5 5.c3 and now 5...Nf6 will transpose into a safe variation of the Giuoco Piano.  Black can instead accept the gambit with 5...dxc3, but this is riskier because White will gain a lead in development after 6.Bxf7+ Kxf7 7.Qd5+ and Qxc5.

The Black response 4...Bb4+ to the Scotch Gambit is called the London Defense.

Göring Gambit: 4.c3 

The Göring Gambit is a relative of the Danish Gambit that starts with 4.c3.  White sacrifices one or two pawns in return for a lead in development, and typically follows up by putting pressure on f7 with Bc4, Qb3 and sometimes Ng5, while Nc3–d5 is another common motif.  The Oxford Companion to Chess notes that the gambit was first played at high levels by Howard Staunton in the 1840s, and the earliest game with it was probably played in 1843.  The first game with the gambit accepted may be Meek vs Morphy, New York 1857. Carl Theodor Göring introduced it into master play in 1872, but while Göring's name is most often associated with the one-pawn gambit (5.Nxc3) Göring invariably used the double-pawn gambit with 5.Bc4.  The gambit has been played by Ljubomir Ljubojević, David Bronstein, Frank Marshall, and Jonathan Penrose.  In casual games Alexander Alekhine often transposed to it via the move order 1.e4 e5 2.d4 exd4 3.c3 dxc3 4.Nxc3, when ...Nc6 for Black and Nf3 for White often followed.  In general, the opening is unpopular at master level but is more popular at club level.  It is recommended to study the Göring Gambit in connection with the Danish.

4...d5
Black can equalise by transposing to the Danish declined with 4...d5, when the critical line runs 5.exd5 Qxd5 6.cxd4 Bg4 7.Be2 Bb4+ 8.Nc3 Bxf3 9.Bxf3 Qc4 (or 6...Bb4+ 7.Nc3 Bg4 8.Be2 Bxf3 9.Bxf3 Qc4, leading to the same position), often referred to as the Capablanca Variation in view of the strength of Black's concept in the game Marshall–Capablanca, Lake Hopatcong 1926.  This line (which can also arise from the Chigorin Defense to the Queen's Gambit), forcing White to either exchange queens or forgo the right to castle with the risky 10.Be3, deters many players from employing this gambit.  Equal endgames result after either 10.Qb3 Qxb3 11.axb3 Nge7 or 10.Bxc6+ bxc6 11.Qe2+ Qxe2+ 12.Kxe2 Ne7.  If Black avoids steering for Capablanca's ending, e.g. with 6...Nf6 or 7...0-0-0 in the above lines, then White obtains good piece play in return for the isolated d-pawn.  White can deviate with 6...Bg4 7.Nc3, with the idea of meeting 7...Bb4 with 8.a3 (or 6...Bb4+ 7.Nc3 Bg4 8.a3) or the rare 5.Bd3, neither of which promise an advantage but which avoid those endings.

Other ways of declining
Black can also decline with 4...Nf6, transposing to a line of the Ponziani Opening.  The continuation 5.e5 Ne4 was endorsed by Dangerous Weapons, 1.e4 e5 (Everyman Chess, 2008) but Tim Harding considers 5...Nd5 a better try for equality, when White can continue 6.Bb5 a6 7.Ba4 Nb6 8.Bb3, 6.Qb3, 6.Bc4 or 6.cxd4.  Another possibility is 4...Nge7 intending 5...d5, when the critical continuation is 5.Bc4 d5 6.exd5 Nxd5 7.0-0.  According to IM John Watson Black may be able to equalise with 7...Be7.  However, declining with 4...d3 allows White some advantage after 5.Bxd3 d6 6.Bf4 Be7 7.h3 Nf6 8.Nbd2 Bd7 9.Qc2 according to Batsford Chess Openings 2.

One-pawn gambit: 4...dxc3 5.Nxc3 
If Black accepts the gambit with 4...dxc3, White can commit to sacrificing only one pawn with 5.Nxc3.  Black's most critical response is generally considered to be 5...Bb4, when White does not get enough compensation after 6.Bc4 d6 7.0-0 Bxc3 8.bxc3 Nf6!, when 9.Ba3 Bg4 is insufficient and 9.e5 Nxe5 10.Nxe5 dxe5 11.Qb3 (11.Qxd8+ Kxd8 12.Bxf7 Ke7 is also good for Black) 11...Qe7 12.Ba3 c5 does not give enough compensation for two pawns.  White can deviate with 7.Qb3, when the old main line runs 7...Qe7 8.0-0 Bxc3, and here 9.Qxc3 gives White good compensation.  Thus both John Watson and USCF master Mark Morss recommend 7...Bxc3+, in order to meet 8.Qxc3 with 8...Qf6! when White loses too much time with the queen.  Thus White often continues 8.bxc3 when 8...Qe7 9.0-0 Nf6 can be met by 10.e5 (transposing back to lines arising from 7.0-0 Bxc3 8.bxc3 Nf6 9.e5, though these are insufficient for White) or the relatively unexplored 10.Bg5.  Other deviations for White include 7.Ng5 and 6.Bg5.

Black's main alternative is 5...d6 which usually leads to complications and approximately equal chances after 6.Bc4 Nf6 7.Qb3 Qd7 8.Ng5 Ne5 9.Bb5 c6 10.f4, or 7.Ng5 Ne5 8.Bb3 h6 9.f4.  5...Bc5 is also playable, transposing to the Scotch Gambit after 6.Bc4 but cutting out the Bxf7+ possibility.  5...Nf6 6.Bc4 can transpose back to 5...d6 lines after 6...d6, or Black can attempt to transpose to 5...Bb4 lines with 6...Bb4 but this allows 7.e5 d5 8.exf6 dxc4 9.Qxd8+ Nxd8 10.fxg7 Rg8 11.Bh6.

Double-pawn gambit: 4...dxc3 5.Bc4 
Alternatively White can transpose into the Danish by offering a second pawn with 5.Bc4 cxb2 6.Bxb2, an approach which John Emms considers far more dangerous for Black.  If Black does not accept the second pawn with 5...cxb2, then White can avoid Black's most critical response to 5.Nxc3 (5...Bb4 6.Bc4 d6).  For instance, after 5...d6, White's best is 6.Nxc3, transposing back to the 5.Nxc3 d6 line.  5...Nf6 6.Nxc3 transposes to the 5.Nxc3 Nf6 line, 5...Bb4 is well met by 6.0-0 or 6.bxc3 (transposing to the Scotch Gambit), 5...Bc5 also transposes to the Scotch Gambit while 5...Be7?! (which is well met by 6.Qd5) transposes to the Hungarian Defense.

Thus Black's most critical response is to take the second pawn with 5...cxb2 6.Bxb2. Instead, play often continues 6...d6 7.0-0 Be6 8.Bxe6 fxe6 9.Qb3 Qd7 or 7.Qb3 Qd7 8.Bc3 Nh6.  6...Bb4+ is the main alternative for Black, whereupon an approach with  castling is considered dangerous for Black, e.g. 7.Nc3 Nf6 8.Qc2 d6 9.0-0-0.

See also
 List of chess openings
 List of chess openings named after places

References

Bibliography

Further reading

External links

 The Games of the Match of Chess Played Between The London and The Edinburgh Chess Clubs In 1824, 1825, 1826, 1827 and 1828
 History of the Scotch at the Edinburgh Chess Club

Chess openings
1824 in chess
18th century in chess